The Autonomous University of Queretaro (in ) is a Mexican public university based in the city of Santiago de Querétaro, Querétaro, but with campuses around the state. The main campus is located in Cerro de las Campanas, but there are campuses in Amealco, Amazcala, Cadereyta, Corregidora, Jalpan, Juriquilla,  San Juan del Río, and Tequisquiapan. It is the largest and most important university in both the state and the city of Queretaro.

History
The University of Queretaro (now the Autonomous University of Queretaro) was founded in 1951 after the closing of the Civil School. Octavio S. Mondragón, then Governor of Querétaro, helped found the university, in the form of a High School, Law School, and Engineering School. In 1952, the School of Chemistry and the School of Nursing were formed. In 1953, the Institute of Fine Arts was formed, and in 1954 the School of Commerce began.

On February 5, 1959, the university was declared autonomous. In 1967 the School of Psychology and the School of Modern Languages were created. The Cerro de las Campanas Campus became the main campus in December 1973. In 1978, the School of Medicine was founded; in 1984, Sociology; 1985, Veterinary; in 1978, both the School of Informatics (Computer Science) and the School of Philosophy. In 2010 the University opened its new Language Learning Facilities on the grounds of the old Ing. Fernando Espinoza Gutiérrez International Airport.

Media
The university operates a radio station, XHUAQ-FM 89.5, and XHPBQR-TDT, a television station on virtual channel 24.

Schools

 Escuela de Bachilleres (High School)
 North School
 South School
 Pedro Escobedo School
 San Juan del Río School
 Ajuchitlán School
 Bicentenario School

Colleges

 Contability and Administration College
 Chemistry College
 Engineering College
 Fine Arts College
 Informatics College
 Languages and Letters College
 Laws College
 Medicine College
 Naturals Sciences College
 Nursing College
 Philosophy College
 Politics and Social Sciences College
 Psychology College

See also
 List of Jesuit sites

References

 
Educational institutions established in 1951
1951 establishments in Mexico